Maytenus disperma, sometimes referred to as the orange boxwood, is a shrub or small tree growing in eastern Australia. Often seen in and near dry rainforests.

References

 </ref>
 

Flora of New South Wales
Flora of Queensland
disperma
Trees of Australia
Taxa named by Ferdinand von Mueller